Aravaca Club de Fútbol is a football club from Madrid in the Community of Madrid, in Spain. 

Founded in 1933, it is one of the oldest clubs in Madrid. Currently it plays in the Tercera División Group 7. 

Its stadium is the Estadio Antonio Sanfíz which has a capacity of 2000 spectators.

In 2017, Aravaca tied one game in the Copa Federación, against Fuenlabrada, who lost the final against Atlético Saguntino.

Season to season

5 seasons in Tercera División

External links
Official website
Futmadrid.com profile

Football clubs in Madrid
Divisiones Regionales de Fútbol clubs
Association football clubs established in 1933
1933 establishments in Spain